Jerrold Bates Tunnell (September 16, 1950 – April 1, 2022) was a mathematician known for his work in number theory. He was an associate professor of mathematics at Rutgers University.

Early life and education
Tunnell was born on September 16, 1950, in Dallas, Texas.

He graduated from Harvey Mudd College in 1972. He received his PhD in Mathematics from Harvard University in 1977. His thesis, On the Local Langlands Conjecture for GL(2), was advised by John Tate.

Career
After graduation, Tunnell taught at Princeton University and was a member of the Institute for Advanced Study from 1982 to 1983. He joined the mathematics faculty at Rutgers University in 1983, eventually becoming an associate professor of mathematics. He advised 7 PhD students.

Research
In 1981, Tunnell generalized Langlands' work on the Artin conjecture, establishing a special case known as the Langlands–Tunnell theorem that later became a key component in the proof of Fermat's Last Theorem.

He proved Tunnell's theorem in 1983, which gives a partial unconditional solution to the congruent number problem and a complete solution conditional on the Birch and Swinnerton-Dyer conjecture.

Awards and honors
In 2013, Tunnell was elected in the inaugural class of Fellows of the American Mathematical Society.

Personal life
Starting in 2004, Tunnell made cross-country cycling trips from Highland Park, New Jersey, to Syracuse, New York, in every U.S. election cycle.

Tunnell died on April 1, 2022, in rural Texas. He was hit by a truck while riding his bicycle from St. Augustine, Florida, to his 50th class reunion at Harvey Mudd College in Claremont, California.

References

External links
 
 

1950 births
2022 deaths
20th-century American mathematicians
21st-century American mathematicians
Rutgers University faculty
Fellows of the American Mathematical Society
Harvard University alumni
Harvey Mudd College alumni
Educators from Texas
Writers from Dallas
Road incident deaths in Texas